Thailand has been participating at the Deaflympics since 2005. Thailand has won 2 medals.

Thailand has competed at the Summer Deaflympics since 2005.

Medal tallies

Summer Deaflympics

Medals

Source:

Medals by Summer Games

Medals by Winter Games

See also 
 Thailand at the Olympics
 Thailand at the Paralympics

References 

 Thailand at the Deaflympics 

Nations at the Deaflympics